Salacia chinensis is a species of plant in the family Celastraceae. A climbing shrub, it is also known as Chinese salacia, lolly berry, and saptachakra in Ayurveda. The plant is found widespread in South-East Asia and Australoceania.

Description
Leaves are elliptic, narrowly ovate-round or obovate-elliptic 4.2-10.5 cm long and 2.2-4.0 cm wide, and glabrous; the petioles are 5–8 mm long. The fruit has one seed in it, the seed is only 8 mm long. Flowers have five petals and they are yellow or yellowish-green.

References

chinensis